Licinius was Roman emperor from 308 to 324. The name may also refer to:

 Licinius Crassus (disambiguation)
 Marcus Licinius Crassus, triumvir
 Licinius Macer, Roman historian
 Lucullus (Lucius Licinius Lucullus), Roman general

See also

 
 Licinia gens